Survivors Guilt: The Mixtape (stylized uppercase) is a mixtape by KennyHoopla and Travis Barker. The mixtape was released on June 11, 2021 through Arista Records and Mogul Vision. It is the debut mixtape by KennyHoopla and Barker's second mixtape, his first since 2011's Let the Drummer Get Wicked. Two singles were released ahead of the mixtape: "Estella" and "Hollywood Sucks".

Track listing 

Notes
 All tracks are stylized in lowercase and feature "//" (two forward slashes) at the end of the title.

Critical reception  

Survivor's Guilt: The Mixtape received critical acclaim from contemporary music critics upon its release. On review aggregator website, Album of the Year, the mixtape has an average rating of 85 out of 100 based on three critic reviews. Emma Swann of DIY praised the album, giving it a full five stars out of five, saying calling the mixtape "a head-rush of a collection in the best possible way" and praising the collaborating between La'ron and Barker saying "whoever paired this duo up deserves a medal". Swann further praised Barker's drumming saying "it’s not just that the blink-182 drummer is using his not inconsiderable platform to direct rock's gaze towards the newcomer: his signature pummelling here creates the kind of pace and challenge that keeps both Kenny - and the listener - on their toes to exhilarating effect".

Ben Jolley, writing for the New Musical Express gave the mixtape a four-star rating, summarizing the album with tracks that "instantly erupt into massive arena-filling singalong anthems". And that several songs "could pass as classics from the not-so-forgotten era". In a staff review for Sputnikmusic, the review was slightly more mixed saying that it's "promising concept, the potential for him to find his own unique style even moreso. As long as he's this entertaining, though, the genre could do far worse in finding a new face than this beguiling, shape-shifting newcomer".

References

External links 
 

2021 mixtape albums
KennyHoopla albums
Travis Barker albums
Arista Records albums